Pokhariya or Pokharia is the clan of rajput thakurs that live in the Uttarakhand state of India. It is an old Rajput (Thakur) clan living in the Garkha region of Pithoragarh district in the Kanalichhina developmental block of Didihat Tehsil. Pokhariya have ruled Nepal for 200 years and changed the dynamics of Nepali culture. They migrated to India and ruled pithotaghar to Kanalichhina. The Bhandari clan  and bhist clan were their soldiers who were benefitted a lot under Pokhariya's rule. The history of Pokhariya's Rajput clan traces back to the medieval period. They were primarily from the area now called Pokharan (District Jailsalmer) in modern Rajasthan and belong to the mighty 'Pithoragarh' clan of Rajput dynasty. Muslim attackers attempted to convert them there; Seeking to preserve their purity of blood, they "refused to Submit" and waged guerrilla warfare against the Muslims And saved Kumaon region from muslim rulers.They later conquered Nepal and settled near modern Pokhara in Nepal.

See also
Kumauni People

Social groups of Uttarakhand
Pithoragarh district